The 2005 WNBA season was the 9th season for the San Antonio Silver Stars franchise. It is the 3rd season in San Antonio. The season saw the franchise going dead last in the Western Conference.

Offseason

WNBA Draft

Margo Dydek was traded to the Connecticut Sun for Katie Feenstra during the draft.

Regular season

Season standings

Season schedule

Player stats

References

San Antonio Stars seasons
San Antonio